The Eiðar longwave transmitter was a facility used by RÚV (The Icelandic National Broadcasting Service) for longwave radio broadcasting on 207 kHz with a power of 100 kW. The transmitter, situated at Eiðar near Egilsstaðir, uses as antenna an omnidirectional aerial in the form of a 221-metre-high steel lattice mast radiator insulated against the ground. Originally a taller mast was planned, but aircraft flight safety considerations precluded this.

On the powerful long-wave, RÚV has broadcast day-to-day down into the deepest valleys and out into the mountains. But now few have radios that receive longwave and the system is no longer considered suitable for security broadcasts. The mast was taken down in 2. March 2023.

References

External links
 http://skyscraperpage.com/diagrams/?b61312
 https://www.tiktok.com/@ruvfrettir/video/7205980459442932998
 https://www.ruv.is/frettir/innlent/2023-02-27-langbylgjan-a-eidum-syngur-sitt-sidasta-mastrid-fellt-a-midvikudag

Broadcast transmitters
Radio masts and towers in Europe
Towers in Iceland